Motol can mean:

 Motol (Prague), an area in Prague, the capital city of the Czech Republic
 Motal, an area in Belarus